The 1964 Baltimore Orioles season involved the Orioles finishing 3rd in the American League with a record of 97 wins and 65 losses, two games behind the AL champion New York Yankees. Baltimore spent 92 days in first place during the season before relinquishing that position on September 18.

Offseason 
 November 27, 1963: Jim Gentile and $25,000 were traded by the Orioles to the Kansas City Athletics for Norm Siebern.
 December 2, 1963: Lou Jackson was drafted by the Orioles from the Milwaukee Braves in the 1963 rule 5 draft.
 March 31, 1964: Buster Narum was traded by the Orioles to the Washington Senators for a player to be named later. The Senators completed the deal by sending Lou Piniella to the Orioles on August 4.

Regular season

Season standings

Record vs. opponents

Notable transactions

Roster

Player stats

Batting

Starters by position 
Note: Pos = Position; G = Games played; AB = At bats; H = Hits; Avg. = Batting average; HR = Home runs; RBI = Runs batted in

Other batters 
Note: G = Games played; AB = At bats; H = Hits; Avg. = Batting average; HR = Home runs; RBI = Runs batted in

Pitching

Starting pitchers 
Note: G = Games pitched; IP = Innings pitched; W = Wins; L = Losses; ERA = Earned run average; SO = Strikeouts

Other pitchers 
Note: G = Games pitched; IP = Innings pitched; W = Wins; L = Losses; ERA = Earned run average; SO = Strikeouts

Relief pitchers 
Note: G = Games pitched; W = Wins; L = Losses; SV = Saves; ERA = Earned run average; SO = Strikeouts

Awards and honors 
 Hank Bauer, Associated Press AL Manager of the Year

Farm system 

LEAGUE CHAMPIONS: Rochester, Elmira, Fox Cities, Aberdeen

Notes

References 

1964 Baltimore Orioles team page at Baseball Reference
1964 Baltimore Orioles season at baseball-almanac.com

Baltimore Orioles seasons
Baltimore Orioles season
Baltimore Orioles